Colin Sexstone (2 July 1948 ― 24 February 2023) was a former Chairman of Bristol City Football Club and recently a Non-executive Director at Plymouth Argyle. Sexstone joined the board of directors of Bristol Rovers FC  in Sept 2015.

Education 
Born in South Bristol and educated at Luckwell, South Street and Colston’s school, Sexstone went on to complete a Business Studies degree at the Bristol College of Commerce.

Career 
Sexstone started his professional career working for G.B. Britton before joining the R.A.F where he enjoyed a 25 year career, retiring in 1996 as Group Captain. 

Appointed as chief executive of Gloucestershire County Cricket Club in 1996, Sexstone helped the club develop the County Ground to international standards. During his five year tenure, Gloucestershire went onto win five trophies, including the Benson & Hedges Super Cup in 1999, Benson & Hedges Cup 2000, the Natwest Trophy in 1999 and 2000 as well as the one day, Norwich Union National League in 2000.

Sexstone joined Bristol City as chief executive in 2001, helping to lead the club's new £92m regional stadium development at neighbouring Ashton Vale. 

He replaced Steve Lansdown as chairman of the club on 1 June 2011 before stepping down as chairman on 31 May 2012 to "pursue other interests". He was replaced by director Keith Dawe.

In July 2011 Colin was appointed chairman of boutique law firm Cook & Co Solicitors.

On 13 November 2012 Colin was appointed a Non-executive Director at League Two club Plymouth Argyle. He resigned from this role on 14th September 2015 to take up a position as a director of fellow league 2 club Bristol Rovers.

Colin passed away on February 24th, 2023.

References 

Bristol City F.C.
Living people
1948 births